The primary social issues in Vietnam are rural and child poverty.

Vietnam scores 37.6 in the Gini coefficient index, with the top 10% accounting for 30.2% of the nation’s income and the bottom 10% receiving 3.2%. In 2008, 14% of the population lives below the national poverty line of US$1.15 per day.

Rural poverty

Gross Domestic Product grew at an average of 7.5% from 2000-2008. The country was able to reduce poverty fate from 58.1% in the 1990s to 14% in 2008. While the country grows and overall poverty drops, urban dwellers benefitted more than their rural counterparts and a wide income disparity grew between the rich and poor. The regions with the highest relative poverty include the north-west, north-central, central highlands, central coast and north-east. 

These regions do not offer the resources to conduct agricultural activities, the main source of income. The poorest rural people live in remote areas with small plots of low quality land that is unsuitable for farming. Similarly, people living along the coastline are faced with harsh climate conditions that restrict farming.

Child Poverty

Child poverty declined from 65.2% in the 1993 to 26.7% in 2004. The Survey on Household Living Standards data set from 2008 showed that 1 in 3 children in Vietnam is poor. Despite the drop, child poverty remains much higher than the national poverty rate. Many children lack access to the basic necessities of food, water, education and sanitation. This is especially so in rural areas.

The government and United Nations Children’s Fund (UNICEF) developed a multidimensional approach to tackle child poverty. “If children grow up in poverty, they are more likely to be poor in adulthood as well. Reducing child poverty will, therefore, not only improve children’s lives today, but also contribute to reducing adult poverty in the long run”. stated Jesper Morch, UNICEF Representative in Vietnam.

References

Politics of Vietnam
Society of Vietnam